Orapa Airport  is an airport serving Orapa, a town in the Central District of Botswana. It is owned by Debswana, which also owns the Orapa diamond mine.

There is no scheduled airline service. Landing permission must be obtained from Debswana at least 48 hours prior to arrival. Orapa is an airport of entry and departure for common customs only. Immigration should handled through Botswana's international airports.

The Orapa non-directional beacon (Ident: OR) is located on the field.

See also

Transport in Botswana
List of airports in Botswana

References

External links
OpenStreetMap—Orapa
OurAirports—Orapa

Airports in Botswana
Central District (Botswana)